Diane Thiede Rover is a professor of electrical and computer engineering at Iowa State University. She was named Fellow of the Institute of Electrical and Electronics Engineers (IEEE) in 2016 "for contributions to active learning methods in engineering education".

References 

Fellow Members of the IEEE
Iowa State University faculty
21st-century American engineers
Living people
Year of birth missing (living people)
American women engineers
American women academics
21st-century American women
American electrical engineers